Abbotsford Traditional Senior School is a public high school in Abbotsford, British Columbia, Canada, and is part of School District 34 Abbotsford.

History
The school was established in 2004. Its original building was converted from the Mountain Park Community Church, who continued to hold services there. It is thought that it was the only school with a baptistery. The present premises were converted from the Career Technical Centre, and it shares the site with the Abbotsford Traditional Middle School.   It is home to the Dr. Marg McDonough Memorial Library.

References

External links
 Official site

High schools in Abbotsford, British Columbia
Educational institutions established in 2004
2004 establishments in British Columbia